A charcoal burner is someone whose occupation is to manufacture charcoal. Traditionally this is achieved by carbonising wood in a charcoal pile or kiln. 

Charcoal burning is one of the oldest human crafts. The knowledge gained from this industry still contributes to the solution of energy problems today. Due to its historical and cultural importance, charcoal burning and tar distilling were incorporated in December 2014 into the register of the Intangible Cultural Heritage in Germany by the Kultusministerkonferenz.

History and technique

Medieval charcoal burners
Since the Iron Age, high temperatures have had to be produced for iron smelting, for glassmaking, and for the working of precious metals. Charcoal has been used to do this for centuries and, in order to produce it, entire forests were felled. With the increasing use of stone coal from the 18th century, the charcoal burning industry declined.

Even in ancient times, charcoal was manufactured in kilns. Logs were arranged in a conical heap (a charcoal kiln or pile) around posts, a fire shaft was made using brushwood and wood chips and covered with an airtight layer of grass, moss and earth. The pile was ignited inside the firing shaft and, at a temperature of between 300 and 350 °C, the carbonization process began. The process took six to eight days - in large kilns several weeks - during which time the charcoal burner had to control the draught (by piercing small holes and resealing them), being careful neither to allow the pile to go out nor let it go up in flames. By observing the smoke exiting the kiln, the charcoal burner could assess the state of the carbonization process. If the smoke was thick and gray, the wood was still raw; thin, blue smoke indicated good carbonization.

In earlier times, charcoal burners led an austere, lonely life. They had to live near the kiln, usually in a charcoal burner's hut (Köhlerhütte or Köte in Germany, Austria and Switzerland). During the Middle Ages, charcoal burners were ostracised. Their profession was considered dishonourable and they were frequently accused of evil practices. Even today there is a certain denigration of this former occupation. In the German language to have a charcoal burner's faith (Köhlerglauben) is to have blind faith in something. That aside, the continuing requirement to keep the kiln at the right temperature in all weathers meant that the job must have been arduous, lonely and, at times, dangerous.

Modern
Charcoal burning is still carried out commercially in parts of the world. It is rare in Europe, but still practised in Romania, Poland, the UK, Slovenia, and Switzerland. Other places where it is still common are the tropical rain forests of South America and Africa.

Even in the 20th century, charcoal burners in remote areas like the Harz Mountains and the Thuringian Forest, still used a illebille, a large contraption of beechwood boards, used as alarm and signal device. This is commemorated in the name of a mountain ridge in the Harz, called Hillebille. Today the tradition of this old craft is mainly preserved in clubs and societies. The best known are the European Charcoal Burners' Society (Europäische Köhlerverein) and the Glasofen Charcoal Burners' Society (Köhlerverein Glasofen).

In popular culture

Saint Alexander of Comana (died c. 251) is known as "the charcoal burner". He is said to have taken up the job of the charcoal burner to avoid worldly acclaim.

A. A. Milne's poem "The Charcoal Burner" appeared in Now We Are Six, a collection of verse.  It begins:
The Charcoal Burner has tales to tell.
He lives in the forest,
alone in the forest;
he sits in the forest,
alone in the forest.
And the sun comes slanting between the trees

In Swedish children's author Maria Gripe's Hugo and Josephine trilogy (the middle book of which was made into the film Hugo and Josephine in 1967), the character Hugo's father is a charcoal burner. Both father and son are portrayed as independent, unmaterialistic people with forestcraft skills. When Hugo is first introduced, his father the charcoal burner is in prison for assault, something Hugo attributes to him trying to live in a town instead of alone in the forest.

See also 
Biochar

References

Bibliography

External links 

European Charcoal Burning Society
Alte Waldberufe – der Köhler (in German).
Michaela Vieser, Irmela Schautz: Ohne Köhler kein Fortschritt at Spiegel Online on 22 June 2012 (in German)
Willkommen bei den Köhlern von Romoos (Charcoal burning in the Entlebuch UNESCO Biosphere Cultural Heritage) (in German)
Charcoal Land Dole pri Litiji Oglarska dežela // OGLARSTVO (in Slovenian)

Charcoal
Crafts
Obsolete occupations
Forestry occupations
Intangible Cultural Heritage of Humanity